Dr Robin Daniels is CEO of Magma Innovations and was previously a Vice President of Living PlanIT SA. He was previously CEO of the UK's largest science park, Norwich Research Park - also Europe's largest single-site life science cluster. He was described by The Times newspaper in August 2006 as "one of the UK’s leading experts on innovation and technology enterprise".

Previously he was Chief Operating Officer of the Centre for Scientific Enterprise Ltd, a joint venture between London Business School, where he was also a member of staff, and University College London. During this time he was also architect and director of the Chevening Technology Enterprise Scholarship or CTES Programme. CTES is a technology commercialisation programme involving 16 UK universities and (by 2005) has generated around £50m of economic value for the UK. CSEL and CTES are both cited as national best practice by a Department of Trade and Industry report.

Previously Daniels was Director of the Manufacturing Leaders Programme at Cambridge University following operational and general management posts in the automotive and material handling sectors with Dunlop Group and Harnishfeger Industries Inc.

Daniels is also a co-founder of a number of technology start-up businesses. He is a close associate of former Ford Europe President and Maserati CEO, Martin Leach, having co-founded Magma Innovations www.magmagroup.eu with Leach. Daniels was policy advisor on economic competitiveness to the Conservative Shadow Cabinet before the 2010 General Election. Daniels holds BEng(Hons) and PhD (Psychology) degrees from Loughborough University, completing his doctorate in record time and being named as Post-Graduate Student of the Year by the Institute of Directors. He is a member of Wolfson College, Cambridge and a Fellow of the Royal Society of Arts.

References

External links
 
 Norwich Research Park
 Manufacturing Leaders Programme

Year of birth missing (living people)
Living people
Alumni of Loughborough University
Academics of London Business School
Fellows of Wolfson College, Cambridge
Place of birth missing (living people)